The Santa María Dam is a reinforced concrete gravity dam and power plant spanning the Samalá River in Zunil, Escuintla, Guatemala.

The dam's reservoir has a total capacity of 215,500 m3. The water is transported to the powerhouse through 614 m long pressure pipe. The plant has 3 different turbines ( and ) with a total installed capacity of 6.88 MW. The plant has a level declination of 101 m, and a designed flow of 2.35 m3/s for unit 1 and 2, and 2.42 m3/s for unit 3.

The plant started operating in 1927 and produces annually 38 GWh of electrical power.

See also

 List of hydroelectric power stations in Guatemala

References

External links
 

Hydroelectric power stations in Guatemala
Energy infrastructure completed in 1927
Dams completed in 1927
Dams in Guatemala